is the debut single from Japanese idol group Hinatazaka46. It was released on March 27, 2019, through Sony Music Entertainment Japan. The title track features Nao Kosaka as center. The single was announced on February 11, 2019 on a Showroom livestream. The music video for the title track, "Kyun", was released on YouTube and Hinatazaka46's official website on March 5, 2019. The video was shot at a school and features a scene of around 100 people dancing on the school's outdoor field. It debuted at number one on the Oricon Singles Chart with over 476,000 copies sold.

Release 
This single was released in 4 versions. Type-A, Type-B, Type-C and a regular edition.

Track listing 
All lyrics written by Yasushi Akimoto.

Type-A

Type-B

Type-C

Regular edition

Participating members

"Kyun" 
Center: Nao Kosaka

 1st row: Mirei Sasaki, Kyōko Saitō, Nao Kosaka, Shiho Katō, Memi Kakizaki
 2nd row: Kumi Sasaki, Akari Nibu, Hina Kawata, Ayaka Takamoto, Miho Watanabe, Mei Higashimura
 3rd row: Suzuka Tomita, Hiyori Hamagishi, Mana Takase, Konoka Matsuda, Hinano Kamimura, Miku Kanemura, Mao Iguchi, Manamo Miyata, Sarina Ushio

"Joyful Love" 
Mao Iguchi, Sarina Ushio, Memi Kakizaki, Shiho Katō, Kyokō Saitō, Kumi Sasaki, Mirei Sasaki, Mana Takase, Ayaka Takamoto, Mei Higashimura, Miku Kanemura, Hina Kawata, Nao Kosaka, Suzuka Tomita, Akari Nibu, Hiyori Hamagishi, Konoka Matsuda, Manamo Miyata, Miho Watanabe

"Tokimeki Sō" 
Mao Iguchi, Sarina Ushio, Memi Kakizaki, Shiho Katō, Kyokō Saitō, Kumi Sasaki, Mirei Sasaki, Mana Takase, Ayaka Takamoto, Mei Higashimura, Miku Kanemura, Hina Kawata, Nao Kosaka, Suzuka Tomita, Akari Nibu, Hiyori Hamagishi, Konoka Matsuda, Manamo Miyata, Miho Watanabe, Hinano Kamimura

"Footsteps" 
Shiho Katō, Kumi Sasaki, Mirei Sasaki, Ayaka Takamoto, Nao Kosaka

"Mimi ni Ochiru Namida" 
Mao Iguchi, Sarina Ushio, Memi Kakizaki, Shiho Katō, Kyokō Saitō, Kumi Sasaki, Mirei Sasaki, Mana Takase, Ayaka Takamoto, Mei Higashimura

"Chinmoku ga Ai Nara" 
Miku Kanemura, Hina Kawata, Nao Kosaka, Suzuka Tomita, Akari Nibu, Hiyori Hamagishi, Konoka Matsuda, Manamo Miyata, Miho Watanabe, Hinano Kamimura

Charts

Weekly charts

Year-end charts

References 

2019 singles
Hinatazaka46 songs
2019 songs
Songs with lyrics by Yasushi Akimoto
Sony Music Entertainment Japan singles
Oricon Weekly number-one singles
Billboard Japan Hot 100 number-one singles